Lt. Robin Crusoe U.S.N. is a 1966 American comedy film released and scripted by Walt Disney, and starring Dick Van Dyke as a U.S. Navy pilot who becomes a castaway on a tropical island. Some filming took place in San Diego, while a majority of the film was shot on Kauai, Hawaii.

The story was loosely based on Daniel Defoe's classic 1719 novel Robinson Crusoe. It was Walt Disney's idea to make the adaptation, and this is the only film in which he received a story credit (as "Retlaw Yensid", which is Walt's name spelled backwards).

Plot
While flying a routine mission for the U.S. Navy from his aircraft carrier, an emergency causes Lieutenant Robin "Rob" Crusoe (Van Dyke) to eject from his F-8 Crusader into the ocean. Crusoe drifts on the ocean in an emergency life raft for several days and nights until landing on an uninhabited island. He builds a shelter for himself, fashions new clothing out of available materials, and begins to scout the island, discovering an abandoned Japanese submarine from World War II. Scouring the submarine, Crusoe also discovers a NASA chimpanzee astronaut named Floyd, played by Dinky.

Using tools and blueprints found in the submarine, Crusoe and Floyd construct a Japanese pavilion, a golf course, and a mail delivery system for sending bottles containing missives to his fiancee out to sea.

Soon after, the castaway discovers that the island is not entirely uninhabited when he encounters a beautiful island girl (Nancy Kwan), whom he names Wednesday. Wednesday recounts that due to her unwillingness to marry, her chieftain father, Tanamashuhi (Akim Tamiroff), plans to sacrifice her and her sisters to Kaboona, an immense effigy on the island with whom he pretends to communicate.

The day Tanamashu arrives on the island, Crusoe uses paraphernalia from the submarine to combat him, culminating in the destruction of the Kaboona statue.

After the battle, Crusoe and Tanamashu make peace. But when Crusoe makes it known that he does not wish to marry Wednesday, he is forced to flee to avoid her wrath. Pursued by a mob of irate island women, he is spotted by a U.S. Navy helicopter and he and Floyd narrowly escape with their lives. Large crowds turn out for their arrival on an aircraft carrier deck, but Floyd steals all the limelight.

Cast

Dick Van Dyke as Lt. Robin Crusoe
Nancy Kwan as Wednesday
Akim Tamiroff as Tanamashu
Arthur Malet as Umbrella Man
Tyler McVey as Captain
Peter Renaday as Pilot
Peter Duryea as Co-Pilot
 John Dennis as Crew Chief
 Nancy Hsueh as Native Girl 1
 Victoria Young as Native Girl 2
 Yvonne Ribuca as Native Girl 3
 Bebe Louie as Native Girl 4
 Lucia Valero as Native Girl 5
 Richard Deacon as Survival Manual Narrator (voice only, uncredited)

Production
Cameraman Robert King Baggot (son of King Baggott) died of injuries received during the filming.

Release
Lt. Robin Crusoe, U.S.N. had its world premiere on June 25, 1966. Because the U.S. Navy cooperated by allowing the producers to film on the aircraft carrier USS Kitty Hawk, Walt Disney arranged a special world premiere aboard the ship in San Diego, simultaneously with the USS Constellation docked in the South China Sea. Disney regulars Fred MacMurray, Suzanne Pleshette and Annette Funicello were among those transported by air to San Diego for the premiere. The film began its theatrical run in Los Angeles four days later on June 29. It was paired with the live-action short Run, Appaloosa, Run!

Home media
In 1986, the film had its first home video release on VHS. On April 12, 2005, it was released on DVD.

Reviews
Upon its initial release, critics gave it lukewarm reviews. However, likely because of Dick Van Dyke's popularity, the film proved to be a financial hit grossing over $22 million at the box office, earning $7.5 million in domestic theatrical rentals. It was re-released to theaters in 1974.

Howard Thompson of The New York Times wrote, "It's neither funny nor new and the picture is recommended, with reservations, only for the very, very young and for television fans who think Mr. Van Dyke can do no wrong." Variety called the film "one of Walt Disney's slighter entries. Intended as a wacky modern-day simulation of the Daniel Defoe classic, it might have borne up in reduced running-time but in its present far-overlength 115 minutes misses as sustained entertainment." Kevin Thomas of the Los Angeles Times wrote that "sophisticated parents might want to stay away," but Dick Van Dyke was "both ingratiating and funny" in the title role. Richard L. Coe of The Washington Post called it a "cheerfully foolish comedy" and concluded, "For sheer comic ease ... Van Dyke is without peer and if 'Robin Crusoe' is no world shaker, it still has Van Dyke."

TV Guide gave the movie 1 out of 5 stars, stating "Robinson Crusoe update is wholly contrived and not really creative." Leonard Maltin's home video guide gave it the lowest possible rating of BOMB and said it had "virtually nothing of merit to recommend."

See also
List of American films of 1966

References

External links
 
 
 
 

1966 films
1960s adventure comedy films
American adventure comedy films
Walt Disney Pictures films
Films about castaways
Films based on Robinson Crusoe
Films shot in Hawaii
Films shot in San Diego
Military humor in film
Films about the United States Navy
Films set in Oceania
Films set on islands
Films produced by Walt Disney
Films produced by Bill Walsh (producer)
Films produced by Ron W. Miller
1966 comedy films
1960s English-language films
1960s American films